Arthur Bonitto (20 February 1914 – 5 October 1990) was a Jamaican cricketer. He played in nine first-class matches for the Jamaican cricket team from 1946 and 1952.

See also
 List of Jamaican representative cricketers

References

External links
 

1914 births
1990 deaths
Jamaican cricketers
Jamaica cricketers
Sportspeople from Kingston, Jamaica